is a Japanese manga series by Ikumi Hino. It was serialized in Kadokawa Shoten's shōnen manga magazine Monthly Shōnen Ace from December 2017 to June 2022, and was collected in nine tankōbon volumes as of August 2022. An anime television series adaptation by Asread aired from July to September 2021.

Plot
Koshi Nagumo, a first year middle school student, finds himself homeless, penniless, and without relatives to care for him after a house fire. As he lies on the street, he gets picked up to become the "dorm mother" of a dormitory full of troubled women's university students.

Characters

A junior high school student who gets a job at the dormitory after his house burned out and he is abandoned by his family.

A resident of the dormitory with androphobia that causes her to have excessive nosebleeds. She is the first to come to view herself as Koushi's older sister while Koushi seemingly develops a crush on her. The ending of the series implies that she ends up with Koushi.

A resident of the dormitory. She has a lab in her room within which she often creates dangerous chemicals and aphrodisiacs.

A resident of the dormitory. She is the heir to a dojo and enjoys cross-dressing and shoujo manga as well as martial arts.

A resident of the dorm. She creates and models cosplays. She often dresses up Koushi in outfits, including women's clothing, much to his embarrassment.

A resident of the dormitory. She claims she is actually an alien, and derives her powers from the moon.

Koshi's childhood friend with a tsundere personality and an aversion to being touched due to her body's abnormal reaction to heat, something Koushi often counteracts through the use of ice-packs.

A university student who is a frequent visitor to the dormitory.

A university student and Uzume's best friend. She is nicknamed "Nagi-chan" and has a gyaru personality.

Media

Manga
Written and illustrated by Ikumi Hino, Mother of the Goddess' Dormitory was serialized in Kadokawa Shoten's shōnen manga magazine Monthly Shōnen Ace from December 26, 2017, to June 24, 2022. The series was collected in nine tankōbon volumes as of August 26, 2022.

Volume list

Anime
An anime adaptation was announced in the fifth volume of the manga on May 25, 2020. It was later revealed to be a television series animated by Asread and directed by Shunsuke Nakashige, with Masashi Suzuki handling the series' scripts, and Maiko Okada designing the characters. Tomoki Kikuya is composing the series' music. The series aired from July 14 to September 15, 2021 on AT-X and other channels. The five-member unit Megami Ryōsei performed the opening theme song "Naughty Love", while Megami Ryōsei+α performe the ending theme song "Zettai! Kimi Sengen." Muse Communication licensed the series in South and Southeast Asia. The series is licensed in territories outside of Asia by Sentai Filmworks and the English dub of the series debuted on the HIDIVE platform on August 25, 2021.

Episode list

References

External links
Mother of the Goddess' Dormitory at Monthly Shōnen Ace 
 

Anime series based on manga
Asread
AT-X (TV network) original programming
Comedy anime and manga
Ecchi anime and manga
Harem anime and manga
Kadokawa Dwango franchises
Kadokawa Shoten manga
Muse Communication
Sentai Filmworks
Shōnen manga